Víctor Alfonso Maffeo Becerra (born 18 September 2000) is a Spanish professional footballer who plays as a right-back for Primera Divisió side  Atlètic d'Escaldes, on loan from Girona.

Club career

Wigan Athletic
Born in Sant Joan Despí, Barcelona, Catalonia, Maffeo had youth spells at Espanyol and Manchester City, alongside his brother Pablo, before joining Wigan Athletic in 2015. On 29 August 2017, Maffeo made his professional debut at the age of 16, during Wigan's EFL Trophy tie against Blackpool. In which, he replaced Callum Lang in the 1–1 draw and scored Wigan's fourth penalty during the 4–3 shootout victory. He scored his first goal for the club in October 2017 in their 4-1 victory over Middlesbrough U23's in the EFL Trophy.

Girona
On 19 August 2019, after 4 years at Wigan, Girona signed Maffeo on a free transfer, returning home to Spain.

Sant Julià (loan)
After an unsuccessful loan at Hércules the previous season, Maffeo joined Andorran side Sant Julià on a season-long loan. Maffeo picked up a suspension after receiving five yellow cards in his first 9 league matches for Sant Julià.

Personal life
Maffeo is the younger brother of Mallorca player Pablo Maffeo.

Career statistics

References

External links

2000 births
Living people
People from Sant Joan Despí
Sportspeople from the Province of Barcelona
Spanish people of Italian descent
Spanish footballers
Footballers from Catalonia
Association football defenders
Wigan Athletic F.C. players
English Football League players
Spanish expatriate footballers
Spanish expatriate sportspeople in England
Expatriate footballers in England
Sportspeople of Italian descent